The  is a commuter electric multiple unit (EMU) train type operated by the Yokohama City Transportation Bureau on the Yokohama Municipal Subway Blue Line in Japan since 1992.

Variants 
The type is subdivided into the following variants, each formed as 6-car sets.
 3000A series: 8 sets, introduced in 1992
 3000N series: 7 sets, introduced in 1999
 3000R series: 14 sets, introduced in 2004
 3000S series: 8 sets, introduced in 2006
 3000V series: 1 set, introduced in April 2017

3000A series 

The 3000A series trainsets were introduced from 1992. They are due to be replaced by new 4000 series EMUs from 2022.

Formation 
, eight six-car sets (24 to 31) are in service, formed as follows, with car 1 at the Shonandai end.

Interior

3000N series

The 3000N series trainsets were introduced from 1999, and featured a new front-end design, while retaining the ribbed stainless body construction of the earlier 3000A series trains.

Formation 
, seven six-car sets (32 to 38) are in service, formed as follows, with car 1 at the Shonandai end.

3000R series 

The 3000R series trainsets were introduced from 2004 to replace the ageing 1000 series sets. These trains have stainless steel bodies with smooth sides.

Formation 
, 14 six-car sets (39 to 52) are in service, formed as follows, with car 1 at the Shonandai end.

Interior 
Passenger accommodation consists of longitudinal seating throughout.

3000S series 

The 3000S series trainsets were introduced from 2006, and were built with same body design as the earlier 3000R series trains, but using the bogies, brakes, and ATC equipment from withdrawn 2000 series trainsets.

Formation 
, eight six-car sets (53 to 60) are in service, formed as follows, with car 1 at the Shonandai end.

3000V series

Introduced in April 2017, the 3000V series is based on the earlier 3000R series design. The "V" classification was chosen using the Roman numeral for "5", as the 3000V series represents the fifth batch of 3000 series trains.

The first 3000V series set (61) entered service on 9 April 2017. A total of seven sets were scheduled to be introduced by 2022 to replace the earlier 3000A series trainsets. However this plan was abandoned in favour of newer 4000 series cars.

Formation 
, one six-car set (61) is in service, formed as follows, with car 1 at the Shonandai end.

Interior 
Each car has a space for wheelchairs and pushchairs.

References 

3000 series
Electric multiple units of Japan
Train-related introductions in 1992
750 V DC multiple units
Tokyu Car multiple units
Nippon Sharyo multiple units